Wyman Duggan is a Republican member of the Florida Legislature representing the state's 15th House district.

Early life 
On April 26, 1969, Duggan was born in Jacksonville, Florida.

Career
Duggan received 40% of the vote in the August 28, 2018 Republican primary, defeating Joseph Hogan and Mark Zeigler. In the November 6, 2018 general election, Duggan narrowly defeated Democrat Tracy Polson, winning 50.93% of the vote.

Committee assignments 

 Insurance & Banking Subcommittee   Chair
 Commerce Committee
 Energy, Communications & Cybersecurity Subcommittee
 Ways & Means Committee
 Justice Appropriations Subcommittee

References

Duggan, Wyman
Living people
21st-century American politicians
1969 births
Politicians from Jacksonville, Florida